The FIL World Luge Natural Track Championships 2000 took place in Olang-Valdaora, Italy.

Men's singles

Women's singles

Men's doubles

The Polish doubles team of Laszczak and Waniczek are the first non-Austrian or Italian team to medal in this event at the World Championships.

Medal table

References
Men's doubles natural track World Champions
Men's singles natural track World Champions
Women's singles natural track World Champions

FIL World Luge Natural Track Championships
2000 in luge
2002 in Italian sport
Luge in Italy